Robert Sam Weil (born 21 November 1948 in Bromma, Stockholm Municipality) is a Swedish businessman and philanthropist.

He is the chairman of the investment company Proventus, which he founded in 1980. He is also chairman of Magasin 3 Stockholm Konsthall, and the Jewish Theatre in Stockholm, and a member of the international advisory board for the Batsheva Dance Company in Tel Aviv. He is also chairman of the Jewish Cultural Heritage Foundation, which he founded in 2005.

References

External links
Proventus company history

1948 births
Living people
Businesspeople from Stockholm
Swedish Jews
20th-century Swedish businesspeople
Swedish philanthropists
21st-century Swedish businesspeople